Bob Joe "Bobby Joe" Waltman (August 12, 1933 – March 16, 2010) was an American politician and businessman.

Born in Ceylon, Minnesota, Waltman graduated from Ceylon High School in 1951. He then served in the United States Air Force from 1951 to 1956. He then worked as an airplane mechanic in Phoenix, Arizona and St. Louis, Missouri. In 1961, Waltman moved with his wife and family to Rochester, Minnesota; he worked at Gopher Aviation. In 1963, Waltman, his wife, and family moved to Elgin, Minnesota where they owned a grocery store. From 1983 to 1994, Waltman served in the Minnesota House of Representatives and was a Republican. Waltman died at his home in Grand Meadow, Minnesota.

Notes

1933 births
2010 deaths
People from Wabasha County, Minnesota
People from Martin County, Minnesota
Military personnel from Minnesota
Businesspeople from Minnesota
Republican Party members of the Minnesota House of Representatives
People from Rochester, Minnesota
People from Mower County, Minnesota
20th-century American businesspeople